Farmhouses Among Trees is an oil painting created by Dutch artist Vincent van Gogh in September 1883.

The painting is exhibited in the Museum of John Paul II Collection in Warsaw.

See also
List of works by Vincent van Gogh

References

External links

Paintings by Vincent van Gogh
1883 paintings
Paintings in Warsaw
Water in art